Webster's New World Dictionary of the American Language is  an American dictionary first published in 1951 and since 2022 published by Harper Collins Publishers.

Overview
The first edition was published by the World Publishing Company of Cleveland, Ohio, in two volumes or one large volume, including a large encyclopedic section. In 1953, World published a one-volume college edition (Webster's New World College Dictionary), without the encyclopedic material. It was edited by Joseph H. Friend and David B. Guralnik and contained 142,000 entries, said to be the largest American desk dictionary available at the time.

The second college edition, edited by Guralnik, was published in 1970. World Publishing was acquired by Simon & Schuster in 1980 and they continued the work with a third edition in 1989 edited by Victoria Neufeldt. A fourth edition was edited by Michael Agnes and published by John Wiley & Sons in 1999, containing 160,000 entries; a fifth, edited by Andew N. Sparks et al. and published by Houghton Mifflin Harcourt in 2014, contains around 165,000.

One of the salient features of Webster's New World dictionaries has been its unusually full etymology, that is, the origin and development of words and the relationship of words to other Indo-European languages. The work also labels words which have a distinctly American origin.

The college edition is the official desk dictionary of the Associated Press, The New York Times, The Wall Street Journal, The Washington Post, and United Press International.

Publisher 

Although the title refers to Noah Webster, the work is unrelated to the series of Webster's dictionaries published by the Merriam-Webster Company, which indeed are descended directly from Noah Webster's original publications. By contrast, Webster's New World Dictionary merely cites Webster as a generic name for any American English dictionary, as does Random House's line of Webster's Unabridged and derived dictionaries.

Webster's New World student and children's editions are produced for younger readers.

See also
Webster's Dictionary (dealing primarily with the line now published by Merriam-Webster)

References

External links 
Webster’s New World Dictionary of the American Language. College Edition (1st edition 1953), here reprint (1966): https://archive.org/details/webstersnewworld00clev/page/n5/mode/2up
Webster's New World Dictionary of the American language. Second College Edition (1970): https://archive.org/details/webstersnewworld00gura_1
Webster's New World Dictionary. Third College Edition (1988): https://archive.org/details/webstersnewworld3rd00neuf/mode/2up
Webster's New World College Dictionary. Fourth Edition (1999): https://archive.org/details/webstersnewworld00agne_0/mode/2up
Webster's New World College Dictionary. Fifth Edition (2014): https://archive.org/details/webstersnewworld0000unse_k1f4/page/n5/mode/2up

External links
Official website

1951 non-fiction books
English dictionaries
Houghton Mifflin books